Limadendron is a genus of small trees in the family Fabaceae that was recently separated from the genus Poecilanthe.

References

Brongniartieae
Fabaceae genera